Ulughbegsaurus (meaning "Ulugh Beg's lizard") is a dubious genus of theropod dinosaur from the Late Cretaceous aged Bissekty Formation, Uzbekistan. The type species is Ulughbegsaurus uzbekistanensis.

Discovery and naming 
Ulughbegsaurus was initially discovered within the Bissekty Formation, Uzbekistan in the 1980s based on the holotype UzSGM 11-01-02, consisting of a partial left maxilla. The holotype, despite its significance, would remain in the collection of the State Geological Museum of the State Committee of the Republic of Uzbekistan on Geology and Mineral Resources, Tashkent, Uzbekistan, until 2019, when it was rediscovered. Two additional referred specimens have been attributed to the genus, including CCMGE 600/12457, an jugal ramus of a left maxilla that was previously referred to the dromaeosaurid Itemirus and ZIN PH 357/16, the posterior end of a right maxilla.

Isolated teeth from the Bissekty Formation show similarities with carcharodontosaurian morphology, suggesting they may belong to Ulughbegsaurus or possibly another genus of carcharodontosaurian.

The genus and species was later named in 2021 by Tanaka et al., honouring the 15th century Timurid sultan and scientist Ulugh Beg and the country of its discovery.

Description

Classification 
Tanaka et al. ran two phylogenetic analyses using two different datasets to determine the relationships of Ulughbegsaurus. The first placed it in a polytomy including Neovenator and other megaraptorans, while the second placed it in a polytomy including other basal carcharodontosaurians; megaraptorans were instead recovered as members of the Tyrannosauroidea.

Both analyses are shown below:

Topology 1: Hendrickx & Mateus dataset
 

Topology 2: Chokchaloemwong et al. dataset
 
However, a later 2022 study suggested that the taxon was a nomen dubium due to lacking diagnostic features, and that it was plausible that the maxilla fragment originated from a dromaeosaurid instead.

Paleoecology 
Ulughbegsaurus coexisted in the Bissekty Formation environment alongside other carnivorous theropods, including the tyrannosauroid Timurlengia and the dromaeosaurid Itemirus.

References 

Bissekty Formation
Prehistoric tetanurans
Turonian life
Late Cretaceous dinosaurs of Asia
Fossil taxa described in 2021
Nomina dubia